Dmytro Kuzmin is a Paralympic swimmer from Ukraine competing mainly in category SB12 events.

Kuzmin is from Poltava. He competed as part of the Ukrainian swimming team at the 2004 Summer Paralympics and was part of the 4 × 100 m freestyle team that won gold in the 49pts race in a new world-record time. In his individual events he won a bronze in the 100m breastroke, finished fifth in the 50m freestyle, fourth in the 400m freestyle, fifth in the 200m medley, and failed to reach the final of the 100m freestyle. He later began skiing.

References

External links
 

Paralympic swimmers of Ukraine
Swimmers at the 2004 Summer Paralympics
Paralympic gold medalists for Ukraine
Paralympic bronze medalists for Ukraine
Ukrainian male breaststroke swimmers
Living people
Medalists at the 2004 Summer Paralympics
Year of birth missing (living people)
Paralympic medalists in swimming
Ukrainian male freestyle swimmers
S12-classified Paralympic swimmers
Sportspeople from Poltava
21st-century Ukrainian people